The Malaysian women's cricket team is the team that represents the country of Malaysia in international women's cricket matches. The team made its debut against Singapore on 30 April 2006, winning by 58 runs. In August 2017, Malaysia won the bronze medal in the women's tournament at the 2017 Southeast Asian Games.

In April 2018, the International Cricket Council (ICC) granted full Women's Twenty20 International (WT20I) status to all its members. Therefore, all Twenty20 matches played between Malaysia women and another international side since 1 July 2018 have been a full WT20I. In June 2018, Malaysia played its first Women's T20I against India in the 2018 Women's Twenty20 Asia Cup.

In December 2020, the ICC announced the qualification pathway for the 2023 ICC Women's T20 World Cup. Malaysia were named in the 2021 ICC Women's T20 World Cup Asia Qualifier regional group, alongside seven other teams. In April 2021, the Malaysian Cricket Association awarded contracts to 15 players, the first time female cricketers for the Malaysian team had been granted contracts.

History
In April 2021, the Malaysian Cricket Association announced it would award central contracts to 15 female players.

Tournament history

Women's Asia Cup
 2018: 6th
 2022: 7th

Current squad

This lists all the players who have played for Malaysia in the past 12 months or were part of the most recent squad. Updated on 24 January 2022.

Records and statistics
International Match Summary — Malaysia Women
 
Last updated 9 October 2022

Twenty20 International 

 Highest team total: 171/4 v. Singapore on 17 June 2022 at Kinrara Academy Oval, Kuala Lumpur.
 Highest individual score: 66*, Winifred Duraisingam v. Singapore on 30 August 2019 at Indian Association Ground, Singapore.
 Best individual bowling figures: 6/3, Mas Elysa v. China on 16 January 2019 at Asian Institute of Technology Ground, Bangkok.

Most T20I runs for Malaysia Women

Most T20I wickets for Malaysia Women

T20I record versus other nations 

Records complete to T20I #1270. Last updated 9 October 2022.

See also
 List of Malaysia women Twenty20 International cricketers

References

External links
 Malaysian international fixtures in 2007
 Report on first match
 Official site of the Malaysian Cricket Association

Cricket in Malaysia
Cricket
Women's national cricket teams
Women